Hawkshead Hill is a hamlet in the South Lakeland district, in the county of Cumbria, England. It is in the Lake District National Park.

Location 
It is located on the B5285 road about a mile west of the village of Hawkshead and about four miles east of the large village of Coniston. It is a few miles away from Windermere, about 3 miles away from Coniston Water and about 3 miles away from the Old Man of Coniston. Almost directly to the south is Hawkshead Hill Park.

See also

Listed buildings in Hawkshead

References 

Hamlets in Cumbria
Hawkshead